"Nothing to Lose" is a song by Canadian band Billy Talent. It was released in November 2004 as the fourth and final single from their debut self-titled album. The song was not released for special digital download or as a CD single or vinyl record.

Content
The song is about a suicidal teenager. The unnamed character suffers rejection from peers and depression, although the character's parents overlook this-Teacher said it's just a phase/When I grow up my children will probably do the same." At the end of the song, it can be inferred that the character committed suicide.

Kids help phone
For every time the song was played on certain Canadian radio stations, Billy Talent would donate $1.00 (CAD) to the Canadian organization Kids Help Phone. Kids Help Phone is a toll-free phone counselling service for children, which suits the song as Kids Help Phone receives many calls from distressed and suicidal teens.

Video
The video was filmed at Central Technical School in Toronto, Ontario and directed by Sean Michael Turrell. It is in black and white and features a teen in a black hooded sweater which hides his face (the suicidal teen). The video alternates between the band playing in the basement of the protagonist's high school and the teen in classes and halls. Throughout the video the teen is writing in a notebook in which the viewer sees fragments of the song's lyrics and drawings. Later, he gets picked on in the hallway by a group of kids who snatch his notebook, and is forced to run away. At the end of the video the character enters the school's garage, attaches one end of a long tube to the exhaust pipe of a car, and brings the other end to the driver's seat with him. Then he starts the car, causing the gas to surround and suffocate him. The last lyrics sung say "There's nothing to gain/And I just died today", showing that the protagonist may have suffocated himself successfully.The line "Who'd know it put me underground at seventeen" also meant that he was 17 when the kids who teased him made him kill himself (underground representing him being buried). Also near the end the character's notebook is open to a page where a drawing can be seen illustrating the suicide. On the same page there is a suicide note that reads: I will do it, I will show you, you will know who I am, you will read this and know who I am, my death will heal this pain, there's nothing to lose and I can't fight this pain anymore. Part of the lyrics are
"There's nothing to gain / My notebook will explain"

Text also appears at the end of the video:

THERE'S LIFE BEYOND THESE WALLS

KIDS HELP PHONE
JEUNESSE, J'ÉCOUTE
1 800 668 6868
www.kidshelpphone.ca

It was #28 on MuchMusic's 50 most controversial videos for its storyline of a high school student committing suicide.

Suicide Room
It was announced at a concert in Warsaw that "Nothing to Lose" is the inspiration for the Polish movie entitled Sala samobójców (Suicide Room). The song also appears on the movie, when the principal character, Dominik Santorski (Jakub Gierszal) goes to the school with a weapon.

Chart positions

References

2004 singles
Billy Talent songs
Songs about suicide
Songs written by Ian D'Sa
Protest songs
Songs written by Benjamin Kowalewicz
Songs written by Jonathan Gallant
Songs written by Aaron Solowoniuk
Song recordings produced by Gavin Brown (musician)
2003 songs
Atlantic Records singles
Black-and-white music videos